Mohamed Bennouna (born 29 April 1943 in Marrakech, Morocco) is a Moroccan diplomat and jurist. He worked as a professor at the Mohammed V University, as a permanent representative of his native country at the United Nations from 1998 to 2001, and as a Judge of the International Criminal Tribunal for the former Yugoslavia. Since 2006, he is a judge of the International Court of Justice.

Biography 
Mohamed Bennouna studied jurisprudence and political science at the University of Nancy and at the Sorbonne in Paris, in addition, he received in 1970 a diploma from the Hague Academy of International Law. Two years later, he earned his doctorate at the University of Nancy in the field of international law, with a thesis on military interventions in non-international conflicts. Then in 1972, he worked as agrégé in the subjects of international law and political science at the Sorbonne. In January 1973, he became a professor at the Mohammed V University, at which he served until 1984, including 1975 to 1979 as dean of the Faculty of Law.

In addition, he worked in senior positions in various bodies and organizations of the United Nations (UN). He served as legal counsel since 1974, inter alia, the delegations of his country at the UN General Assembly and from 2001 to early 2006 as the permanent representative of Morocco to the UN. Between 2004 and 2005, he was Chairman of the United Nations General Assembly Sixth Committee (Legal). From 1986 to 1998 he was a member of the International Law Commission and also from 1991 to 1998 General Director of the Arab World Institute in Paris. From 1998 to 2001 he was judge at the ICTY in The Hague.

His term at the ICJ began in February 2006 and, in 2014, was re-elected for an additional term, which ends in 2024.

Mohamed Bennouna holds several awards including the National prize for culture of Morocco, Medal for culture of Yemen and Knight of the National Order of the Légion d'honneur. He is married and father of three children.

Selected works 
 Le consentement à l’ingérence militaire dans les conflits internes. Paris 1974
 Le droit international relatif aux matières premières. Den Haag 1982
 Le droit international du développement. Paris 1983
 La spécificité du Maghreb arabe. Casablanca 1990

Lectures 
La Cour internationale de Justice, juge des souverainetés? in the Lecture Series of the United Nations Audiovisual Library of International Law

References

1943 births
Living people
Nancy-Université alumni
University of Paris alumni
Academic staff of Mohammed V University
The Hague Academy of International Law people
People from Marrakesh
Permanent Representatives of Morocco to the United Nations
International Law Commission officials
United Nations General Assembly Sixth Committee officials
International Court of Justice judges
20th-century Moroccan judges
Moroccan diplomats
21st-century Moroccan judges
International Criminal Tribunal for the former Yugoslavia judges
Moroccan judges of United Nations courts and tribunals
Moroccan expatriates in France
Members of the Institut de Droit International
Members of the International Law Commission